Saheed Idowu (born 3 January 1990 in Brazzaville) is a Congolese table tennis player. He competed at the 2012 Summer Olympics in the Men's singles, but was defeated in the preliminary round.

2018 ITTF African-Cup
Idowu competed in the 2018 ITTF African-Cup, placing second in group 2 behind Quadri Aruna, dropping the group match to Aruna (1-3),allowing him to qualify for the Quarter Finals. In the Quarter Finals, Idowu faced and defeated African Table Tennis legend Segun Toriola (4-2). In the Semi Finals, Idowu lost to eventual winner Omar Assar, dropping four straight games (0-4). He was then paired against Ahmed Saleh in the placement round, losing that match (1-3), finishing the tournament in fourth place.

Playing Style
Like most modern Table Tennis players, Idowu favors a forehand attacking style. His forehand loop is noted as appearing rather relaxed and unorthodox.

References

Republic of the Congo table tennis players
1990 births
Living people
Sportspeople from Brazzaville
Olympic table tennis players of the Republic of Congo
Table tennis players at the 2012 Summer Olympics
African Games silver medalists for the Republic of the Congo
African Games medalists in table tennis
African Games bronze medalists for the Republic of the Congo
Competitors at the 2011 All-Africa Games
Competitors at the 2015 African Games